The 1968–69 season of the Moroccan Throne Cup was the 13th edition of the competition.

Renaissance de Settat won the cup, beating KAC Kénitra 2–1 in the final, played at the Stade d'honneur in Casablanca. Renaissance de Settat won the cup for the first time in their history.

Tournament

Last 16

Quarter-finals

Semi-finals

Final 
The final took place between the two winning semi-finalists, Renaissance de Settat and KAC Kénitra, on 13 July 1968 at the Stade d'honneur in Casablanca.

Notes and references 

1968
1968 in association football
1969 in association football
1968–69 in Moroccan football